Glamour may refer to:

Arts

Film 

 Glamour (1931 film), a British film
 Glamour (1934 film), an American film
 Glamour (2000 film), a Hungarian film

Writing 

 Glamour (magazine), a magazine for women
 The Glamour (novel), a 1984 novel by Christopher Priest
 "The Glamour" (short story), a short story by Thomas Ligotti

Music 

 Glamour (album), the sixth album of the Japanese hard rock band Show-Ya
 Glamour, a 1981 album by Dave Davies
 The Glamour, a 1995 album by The Comsat Angels
 Glamour (band), an American girl band on The X Factor TV series

Other media 

 Glamour photography, photography that emphasizes the allure of the model

Other uses 

 Shapeshifting, a subtle illusion of mythological or fictional beings, used to hide their true form under a spell of beauty
 Glamour (presentation), an appearance of enhanced attractiveness
 Glamor (software), a driver of the X.Org Server

See also
 Glam (disambiguation)
 Glamorous (disambiguation)